József Gelei (born 29 June 1938) is a Hungarian former professional football player and manager.

Career

Playing career
Gelei, who played as a goalkeeper, played youth football with MTK and Beloiannisz, before turning professional in 1957 with former club MTK. He also played club football with Vasas SC and Tatabánya.

Gelei also played at international level for Hungary, representing them at the 1964 Summer Olympics, 1964 European Nation's Cup and the 1966 FIFA World Cup.

Coaching career
After retiring as a player, Gelei trained as a football coach, and managed a number of club sides in Hungary. He also coached the India national team.

References

1938 births
Living people
Hungarian footballers
Hungary international footballers
Hungarian football managers
Olympic footballers of Hungary
Olympic gold medalists for Hungary
Olympic medalists in football
Footballers at the 1964 Summer Olympics
Medalists at the 1964 Summer Olympics
1966 FIFA World Cup players
FC Tatabánya managers
1964 European Nations' Cup players
Association football goalkeepers
Pécsi MFC managers
India national football team managers
Sportspeople from Jász-Nagykun-Szolnok County
Hungarian expatriate football managers
Hungarian expatriates in India
Expatriate football managers in India